The Sri Lankan Ambassador to the United States is the Sri Lankan envoy to United States.  The Sri Lankan Ambassador to the United States is concurrently accredited as Ambassador to Mexico. The Sri Lankan embassy opened on 29 October 1948 and also maintains a Consul-General in Los Angeles.

Ambassadors

See also
List of heads of missions from Sri Lanka

References

External links
The Embassy of Sri Lanka
Chief of Protocol, 

Sri Lanka
United States